Crooner is a 1932 American pre-Code musical drama film directed by Lloyd Bacon and starring David Manners along with Ann Dvorak and Ken Murray. It concerns the abrupt rise and fall of a popular crooner, Teddy Taylor.

A print is held by the Library of Congress.

Plot
Teddy Taylor is the leader of Ted Taylor's Collegians. One night, his usual singer can't sing. He decides to try out singing. However, his voice can't be heard over the band. A dancer stops and jokes with him by handing him a megaphone. Taylor sings through it, and he is heard. The ladies are enamored with his soft voice while the men are disgusted. Taylor becomes a big star over night, but his ego becomes inflated. Things come to a head when Taylor loses his temper and punches a heckler in the audience, who he didn't realize was a cripple. Shunned, he loses his girlfriend, his band, his fame, and his dignity.

In the final scene, as a drunk and unhappy Peter Sturgis, who promoted Teddy Taylor into a singing star and gave up his fiancée Judy Mason to him, continues to drink heavily in a speakeasy, an announcer on the speakeasy's radio proclaims, "…And now, it is our great privilege to bring to you the new sensation of the air, Bang Busby, who will croon for you in his inimitable manner, 'Sweethearts Forever'". As the song, which had already been sung a number of times by Teddy Taylor, begins to be heard, Sturgis grabs a bottle and hurls it at the radio, breaking it.

Cast

David Manners as Teddy Taylor
Ann Dvorak as Judy Mason
Ken Murray as Peter Sturgis
J. Carroll Naish as Nick Meyer
Guy Kibbee as Mike
Claire Dodd as Mrs. Brown
Allen Vincent as Ralph
Edward J. Nugent as Henry
William Janney as Pat
Teddy Joyce as Mack

Production
Donald Novis provided Ted Taylor's singing voice. Rudy Vallée was originally considered for the role of Taylor, but contracts prevented this.

Reception
"It hands a loud but quite amusing razz to all such radio performers," wrote a critic for Photoplay. "Ken Murray and Ann Dvorak help to make this bright and entertaining."

Soundtrack
 "In A Shanty In Old Shanty Town"
Music by Jack Little and John Siras
Lyrics by Joe Young
 "Sweethearts Forever"
Music by Cliff Friend
Lyrics by Irving Caesar
 "Three's a Crowd"
Music by Harry Warren
Lyrics by Al Dubin and Irving Kahal
 "I Send My Love With These Roses"
Music by Joseph A. Burke
Lyrics by Benny Davis
 "You're Just a Beautiful Melody of Love"
Music by Bing Crosby and Babe Goldberg

External links

References

1932 films
American black-and-white films
1930s musical drama films
Films about singers
Films directed by Lloyd Bacon
First National Pictures films
American musical drama films
1932 drama films
1930s English-language films
1930s American films